Where My Christmas Lives EP is a limited edition studio EP by American rock  band 3 Doors Down, released in 2009. The EP contains a new single, "Where My Christmas Lives", and its acoustic version, along with 6 acoustic versions of songs from the band's 2008 self-titled album. It is exclusively available by digital download from places like iTunes.

Track listing
 "Where My Christmas Lives" – 3:55
 "It's Not My Time" (Acoustic version) – 3:58
 "It's the Only One You've Got" (Acoustic version) – 4:17
 "Your Arms Feel Like Home" (Acoustic version) – 3:48
 "Let Me Be Myself" (Acoustic version) – 3:53
 "Pages" (Acoustic Version) – 3:49
 "Runaway" (Acoustic Version) – 3:25
 "Where My Christmas Lives" (Acoustic version) – 3:51

2009 EPs
3 Doors Down albums
Christmas EPs